Saint   Idesbald (Idesbaldus) (c. 1100–1167) was a Cistercian monk and abbot of Ten Duinen Abbey.

Life
As a youth Idesbald was a courtier and page to the Count of Flanders.  It is believed that he was related to or proceeded from the noble family of Van der Gracht, lords of Moorsel.

He became a canon priest at Veurne in 1135.  In 1150, he became a Cistercian monk at the abbey of Our Lady of the Dunes (Ten Duinen), serving as abbot of this foundation from 1155 to 1167.

Veneration

Idesbald was buried in the abbey in a lead coffin. In 1577, the Geuzen plundered the abbey, and the monks transported Idesbald's relics to a monastic grange at Bogaerde. On 13 November 1623 his coffin was opened in the presence of several witnesses so that the relics could be inspected and authenticated; the body was reported to be incorrupt. For days, the body was shown to visitors. In 1625, during Infanta Isabella Clara Eugenia's progress through Flanders, the body was displayed to the Infanta and her court, including Ambrogio Spinola, Cardinal de la Cueva, and the papal nuncio.

Idesbald's relics were translated again, this time to Bruges, in 1796 to avoid having them destroyed by Revolutionary troops. In 1830, the relics were placed in a chapel associated with the abbey of Our Lady of the Potteries. Idesbald's cult was officially approved in 1894 by a decree issued by the Diocese of Bruges.

In 2015 the lead coffin thought to contain his remains was opened. Both the carbonised lead of the coffin and the skeletal remains inside were radiocarbon-dated. The dates reveal that the remains are not those of St Idesbald, as they date to the later 15th or early 16th century. It is hypothesised that the coffin and skeleton represent the burial of a later abbot

The village of Saint-Idesbald, which gained fame as an artists' quarter, takes its name from him.

Notes

References

External links

Idesbald
 Beato Idesbaldo delle Dune

1100s births
1167 deaths
12th-century Christian saints
Belgian Cistercians
Belgian Roman Catholic saints
Incorrupt saints
People from Koksijde
People from Veurne
Abbots of Dunes
12th-century people from the county of Flanders